Cathay Cineleisure Orchard is an urban mall located at 8 Grange Road, Singapore. The building is managed by Cathay Organisation under its subsidiary company of Cathay Cineleisure International.

Background
The mall opened in October 1997 on the site of the previous building, the old Orchard Cinema, which was torn down in 1994.

The youth-oriented mall houses a mix of food and beverage outlets, fashion shops and a hair salon. It also includes an indoor trampoline park on Level 9. Cathay Cineplex operates 12 movie screens in the mall.

The building has won accolades such as the "SIA-ICI (Singapore Institute of Architects - ICI Paints) Colour Award" for its creative use of colours in its building design. Two of its cinemas (Halls 3 and 6) were voted Singapore's best screens in a survey conducted by The Straits Times in April 1998. In another survey by Ad Post, readers voted Cathay Cineplex Orchard their "Favourite Cinema in Singapore".

See also
 List of shopping malls in Singapore

References

External links

 Cineleisure Orchard official website

Cinemas in Singapore
Shopping malls in Singapore
Orchard Road
1997 establishments in Singapore